Upper Alsace (southern Alsace) was a landgraviate of the Holy Roman Empire centred on Ensisheim and Landser, north of the County of Ferrette (Pfirt). The counts of Habsburg ruled the territory from the 1130s down to its cession to France in the 17th century.

History 

In 1130, the Emperor of the Holy Roman Empire, Lothair III of Supplinburg in order to diminish the power of the Hohenstaufen family in the region, merged three local regions into several larger fiefs. The County of Sundgau, County of Ferrette, and the parts west of the Rhine from the Duchy of Swabia were merged to form the new Landgraviate of Upper Alsace. In 1188, the first mentions of the Landgraviate appear in official records, however the date of probable creation was around 1130. The Landgraviate included the prementioned areas, along with several Seigneuries and city-states located in Upper Alsace.

Albert III, Count of Habsburg, received the landgraviate of Upper Alsace from the Emperor Frederick I in 1186. Frederick's son, Duke Frederick V, was his lord with the title of Duke of Alsace (Elisatiae dux).

On 9 May 1469, Duke Charles the Bold of Burgundy acquired the landgraviate of Upper Alsace and the county of Ferrette for 50,000 Rhenish florins. At the time of its purchase, the landgraviate was heavily mortgaged and pawned. Landser was mortgaged to Thüring von Hallwill for 7,000 florins. On 20 September Charles appointed Peter von Hagenbach as the "grand bailiff (Landvogt) of Ferrette and Alsace" with his seat at Ensisheim. This official was a successor of the previous Austrian-appointed Landvogt, and thus in the service of the landgrave of Upper Alsace. The Landvogtei (bailiwick) of Alsace itself was an imperial office then mortgaged to the Electoral Palatinate.

On 14 April 1646, the imperial ambassador Trauttmansdorff, during negotiations to end the Thirty Years' War, offered "Upper and Lower Alsace and the Sundgau, under the title of Landgraviate of Alsace" to the French. There was no such territory, since Alsace was at the time divided into several jurisdictions held by competing powers. The Archduke Ferdinand Charles held the landgraviate of Upper Alsace, while a relative held the Landvogtei (bailiwick) of Hagenau with a protectorate over the Décapole (a league of ten imperial cities).

Landgraves 

The Landgraviate was owned by the 'Landgrave of Upper Alsace', which was always a member of the House of Habsburg from 1324 by inheritance.

The first Landgrave of the area was Werner II, Count of Habsburg, and was succeeded by his family. The last Landgrave was Ferdinand Charles, Archduke of Austria.

See also 
 Upper Rhine
 University of Upper Alsace

Notes

References

Sources
 Kaeppelin, Charles E. R, and Mary L. Hendee. Alsace Throughout the Ages. Franklin, Pa: C. Miller, 1908.
 Putnam, Ruth. Alsace and Lorraine: From Cæsar to Kaiser, 58 B.C.–1871 A.D. New York: 1915.
 
 
 
 
 


History of Alsace
Counties of the Holy Roman Empire
Landgraves of the Holy Roman Empire

de:Liste der Landvögte im Elsass